Train Tracks is an EP by Australian band Southern Sons. The EP was released in Australia in July 1991 and reached number 40 on the ARIA charts. It is a limited edition pressing, released shortly after the release of their debut self-titled album.

Track listing
 "Waiting for That Train" (P. Bowman, P. Buckle) - 3:43
 "More Than Enough" (Live) (P. Bowman, P. Buckle) - 4:02
 "Do You Want My Love" (Live) (P. Buckle) - 3:51
 "Make a Move" (Live) (P. Buckle) - 7:27
 "Hold Me in Your Arms" (Live) (P. Buckle) - 4:25

Personnel
Jack Jones – lead vocals, guitar
Phil Buckle – guitar, backing vocals
Virgil Donati – drums, keyboards
Geoff Cain – bass
Peter Bowman – guitar, backing vocals

Chart positions

References

1991 debut EPs
Southern Sons albums
RCA Records EPs